Later Jin may refer to two states in imperial China:
 Later Jin (Five Dynasties) (後晉; 936–947), one of the Five Dynasties
 Later Jin (1616–1636) (後金; 1616–1636), precursor to the Qing dynasty

See also 
 Jin (disambiguation), which lists other states named Jin